Nicholas Cundy (born ) is a former Canadian male volleyball player. He was part of the Canada men's national volleyball team. He played CIS volleyball for the Alberta Golden Bears where he was a member of the CIS National Championship team in 2005 and was named the CIS Men's Volleyball Player of the Year that same year.

References

External links
 Profile at FIVB.org

1983 births
Living people
Alberta Golden Bears volleyball players
Canadian men's volleyball players
Place of birth missing (living people)